The Sarma is a river in Irkutsk Oblast, Russia. It runs from the Primorsky Range into the Small Sea Strait of Lake Baikal.

The valley and estuary of Sarma is the source of the strongest of Lake Baikal's winds, the Sarma wind. Its speed may exceed .

See also
List of rivers of Russia

References

Rivers of Irkutsk Oblast